{{Automatic taxobox
| fossil_range = 
| image = Paradoxides_sp.jpg
| image_caption = Paradoxides a trilobite
| image2 = Phytophilaspis outline.svg
| image2_caption = Phytophilaspis, a Xandarellid
| taxon = Artiopoda
| authority = Hou and Bergstrom, 1997
| subdivision_ranks = Subgroupings
| subdivision = *†Squamacula
Protosutura†Acanthomeridion†Zhiwenia†Australimicola†Campanamuta†Falcatamacaris†Molaria†Retifacies†Pygmaclypeatus†BailongiaTrilobitomorpha
†Retifacies?
†Pygmaclypeatus?
†Campanamuta?
†Kwanyinaspis†Arthroaspis†Nektaspida
†Trilobita
†Agnostida
†Conciliterga
†Haifengella†Helmetia†Kuamaia†Kwanyinaspis†Rhombicalvaria†Saperion†Skioldia†Tegopelte†Xandarellida (=Petalopleura)
†Luohuilinella†Cindarella†Phytophilaspis†Sinoburius†XandarellaVicissicaudata
†Xenopoda (possibly paraphyletic)
†Sidneyia†Emeraldella†Etania†Kodymirus†Eozetetes†Cheloniellida
†Aglaspidida
| subdivision_ref = 
}}
The Artiopoda is a grouping of extinct arthropods that includes trilobites and their close relatives. It was erected by Hou and Bergström in 1997 to encompass a wide diversity of arthropods that would traditionally have been assigned to the Trilobitomorpha. Hou and Bergström used the name Lamellipedia as a superclass to replace Trilobitomorpha that was originally erected at the subphylum level, which they considered inappropriate. Trilobites, in part due to their mineralising exoskeletons, are by far the most diverse and long lived members of the clade, with most records of other members, which lack mineralised exoskeletons, being from Cambrian deposits.

Description

According to Stein and Selden (2012) artiopods are recognised by the possession of filiform antennulae, limbs with bilobate exopods, with the proximal lobe being elongate and bearing a lamella, while the distal lobe is paddle-shaped and setiforous (bearing hair-or bristle like structures). The limb endopod has seven podomeres, with first four podomeres bearing inward facing (endite) structures, while podomeres five and six are stenopodous (cylindrical and stout). Common plesiomorphies also include the antellules and at least three sets of post-antellulae limbs being incorporated into the head shield, the postantennular limbs having no or little differentiation into distinct morphologies, and broad paratergal folds which contribute to the dorsoventrally flattened look of artiopods. The limbs of artiopods have also been suggested to bear exites, which were described as similar those of the megacheiran Leanchoilia'' and probably not homologous to those present in crustaceans.

Taxonomy

Internal taxonomy 
Leif Størmer recognised on the basis of limb types that a diverse group of Cambrian arthropods, known largely from the Burgess Shale, were likely to be relatives of the trilobites.  Hou and Bergström formalised this grouping into the Lamellipedia, consisting of two clades: the Marrellomorpha and the Artiopoda. The Artiopoda have subsequently been considered to consist of two major clades; one reusing Trilobitomorpha to encompass trilobites, nektaspids, concilitergans and xandarellids, and the other called Vicissicaudata encompassing aglaspidids, xenopods and cheloniellids.

Relationships with other arthropods 
The relationship of Artiopoda with the two major clades of modern arthropods, the Chelicerata and the Mandibulata, are unresolved, with some phylogenies recovering Artiopoda as more closely to chelicerates, forming the clade Arachnomorpha, while others recover Artiopoda as more closely related to mandibulates, forming the clade Antennulata.

Gallery

Phylogeny 
After Jiao et al. 2021.

References

 
Arthropods